It's Complicated is a 2009 American romantic comedy film written and directed by Nancy Meyers. It stars Meryl Streep as a bakery owner and single mother of three who starts a secret affair with her ex-husband, played by Alec Baldwin, ten years after their divorce – only to find herself drawn to another man: her architect, Adam (portrayed by Steve Martin). The film also features supporting performances by Lake Bell, Hunter Parrish, Zoe Kazan, John Krasinski, Mary Kay Place, Robert Curtis Brown, and Rita Wilson, among others.

The film was met with average reviews from critics, who praised the acting of its ensemble cast but declared its story rather predictable. It became another commercial hit for Meyers, however, upon its Christmas Day 2009 opening release in the United States and Canada. It played well through the holidays and into January 2010, ultimately closing on April 1 with $112.7 million. Worldwide, It's Complicated eventually grossed $219.1 million, and surpassed The Holiday (2006) to become Meyer's third-highest-grossing project to date.

For their performances, the cast was awarded a National Board of Review of Motion Pictures Award for Best Ensemble Cast the same year. In addition, the film was nominated at both the Critics' Choice Awards and the Satellite Awards and garnered Meyers two Golden Globe nominations, including Best Motion Picture – Musical or Comedy and Best Screenplay. Streep and Baldwin each were individually recognized with Best Actress and Best Supporting Actor nominations at the Golden Globe and BAFTA award ceremonies, respectively.

Plot
Jane, who owns a successful bakery in Santa Barbara, California, and Jake Adler, a successful attorney, have been divorced for 10 years. They had three children together, two girls and a boy, the youngest of whom has just left for college, leaving Jane feeling lonely. Jake has since married Agness, the much younger woman he cheated on Jane with.

Jane and Jake attend their son Luke's graduation from college in New York City, while Agness remains behind as her son Pedro is ill. The two have drinks and have a pleasant evening reminiscing together, which leads to them having sex. Jane instantly regrets what they've done, while Jake is thrilled and continues to pursue Jane when they return to Santa Barbara. They soon begin an affair.

While Agness has Jake scheduled for regular sessions at a fertility clinic, Jake is secretly taking medication to decrease his frequent urination, the side effects of which are decreased sperm count and dizziness. After one of his sessions, he has a lunchtime rendezvous with Jane at a hotel. Jake collapses in the hotel room and a doctor is called. The doctor speculates that the reason for Jake's distress may be the medication and says he should stop taking it. Jake and Jane's children know nothing of the affair, but Harley, who is engaged to their daughter Lauren, spots the pair and the doctor in the hotel and endures considerable stress while keeping their secret.

After Jane spends an evening cooking an elaborate meal at Jake's request and he doesn't appear due to Agness changing her plans, Jane ends the affair and begins seeing Adam, the architect hired to remodel her home who is still healing from a divorce of his own. 

On the night of Luke's graduation party in Santa Barbara, Jane invites Adam to the party. She is stoned when he picks her up because she has taken a hit from a marijuana joint that Jake had given her earlier. Before going into the party, Adam smokes some of the joint with Jane. Once inside, they are laughing and happily high, Jake becomes jealous observing them, and after pressing Jane, smokes some with her also. Agness then observes Jake and Jane dancing together and senses they are having an affair. 

After the party, Adam and Jane go to Jane's bakery, where they make pain au chocolat together and end the evening with a romantic kiss. Jake and Agness separate, although it is not clear who has left whom, and the kids, sympathetic to Jake's apparent heartbreak, ask him to stay with them at Jane's, where they enjoy a pleasant evening together as a family.

Jake goes into Jane's bedroom and disrobes in an attempt to seduce her, unaware that she has been speaking with Adam via webcam. He sees Jake and Jane is forced to admit to him and her children that while she and Jake did have an affair, it's over and she is not interested in getting back together with him. Adam later tells Jane he cannot continue seeing her because it will only lead to heartbreak.

Jane reconciles with her children, who admit they were troubled by what has happened between their parents because they're still recovering from the divorce, and amicably ends her affair with Jake for good.

On a rainy day, the construction crew arrives at Jane's house to commence the remodeling. Adam unexpectedly appears, telling her that breaking ground in the rain is good luck, and the two share a laugh as he asks her if she would be willing to make pain au chocolat again.

Cast
 Meryl Streep as Jane Adler, a successful bakery owner.
 Steve Martin as Adam Schaffer, Jane's architect.
 Alec Baldwin as Jacob "Jake" Adler, Jane's ex-husband.
 Lake Bell as Agness Adler, Jake's wife.
 Hunter Parrish as Luke David Adler, Jane and Jake's son.
 Zoe Kazan as Gabby Adler, Jane and Jake's younger daughter.
 Caitlin FitzGerald as Lauren Adler, Jane and Jake's older daughter.
 John Krasinski as Harley, Lauren's fiancé.
 Mary Kay Place as Joanne
 Rita Wilson as Trisha
 Alexandra Wentworth as Diane
 James Patrick Stuart as Dr. Moss, the plastic surgeon
 Blanchard Ryan as Annalise
 Michael Rivera as Eddie
 Robert Curtis Brown as Peter
 Peter Mackenzie as Dr. Alan, Jane's therapist.
 Rosalie Ward as Alex
 Jimmy Clabots as Chase
 Emjay Anthony as Pedro Adler
 Emily Kinney as Waitress.
 Nora Dunn as Sally 
 Bruce Altman as Ted
 Lisa Lynn Masters as the beautiful woman in elevator.
 Pat Finn as Hotel Doctor
 Valente Rodriguez as Reynaldo
 Andrew Stewart-Jones as Restaurant Host
 Geneva Carr as Woman at Fertility Clinic
 Deidre Goodwin as Fertility Nurse
 Jessica St. Clair as Wedding Specialist
 Marina Squerciati as Melanie
 Robert Adamson as College Kid at Party
 Heitor Pereira as Party Musician
 Ramin Djawadi as Party Musician
 Alan Cumming as TV Actor (uncredited)
 Anne Lockhart as Party Guest (uncredited)
 Oprah Winfrey as Herself (uncredited)

Production

Casting

In May 2008, Nancy Meyers agreed to a project for Universal Studios that she would write and direct, to be co-produced with Scott Rudin. The project was referred to as The Untitled Nancy Meyers Project during its inception and early production. Establishing commitments from the principals began in 2008, with Meryl Streep and Alec Baldwin entering discussions in August, and Steve Martin joining the cast in October.  Casting continued through 2009, with Zoe Kazan, Lake Bell, and Hunter Parrish joining in January, John Krasinski in February, Rita Wilson in March, and Caitlin Fitzgerald in June.

Filming
While the majority of the film is set in Santa Barbara, California, most of the filming – including nearly all of the interiors – took place in New York City. Principal photography began on February 18, 2009 at the Broadway Stages in the Brooklyn borough, where the interior scenes of Jane's house were shot. Several other key locations were used during the first portion of filming in New York, including Picnic House, a large, studio-sized structure in Brooklyn's Prospect Park, where Jane's bakery was built inside; the facilities at Sarabeth's Bakery in the Chelsea Market; and a commercial loft building in New York's Chelsea district, where scenes at Adam's office were filmed in. As Martin was soon to embark on a concert tour to promote The Crow: New Songs for the Five-String Banjo (2009), his schedule required the team to complete shooting his scenes during the first two months of filming.

In April 2009, the company relocated to Los Angeles, where cast and crew started filming scenes taking place outside Jane's house, for which a ranch house located in Thousand Oaks in the north of Los Angeles was used. In mid-April, the crew spent a few days filming exteriors in Montecito and Santa Barbara – just days before wildfires took a heavy toll on the area. Additional scenes were taken in front of numerous downtown landmarks, including the Santa Barbara County Courthouse and the El Paseo section. Afterwards, the team returned to Los Angeles for completion of the scenes at Jane's house and for the filming at the Bel-Air Bay Club in the Pacific Palisades neighborhood. In early May, principal photography returned to Brooklyn for completion. For Luke's graduation scenes, shooting took place at St. John's University in Queens and on Park Avenue in Manhattan. Several different locations stood in for the fictional Park Regent hotel: While a residence building on Park Avenue and 59th Street was used for exterior shots, the lobby and Jane's hotel room were in the JW Marriott Essex House. The hotel bar was the interior of a restaurant on Tenth Avenue. Filming eventually completed in August 2009.

The sets were easy to design. Most scenes take place in the protagonist's home and interior courtyard, and as such the details had to be fastidiously worked out, but the rooms were kept bare to reflect the character's functional tastes and limited budget. There are relatively few decorations, just "a bunch of thrift-store things haphazardly thrown together", in the words of production designer Jon Hutman. The building itself is a traditional 1920s Spanish-ranch-style adobe-mud house which "epitomised the Santa Barbara area."

Reception

Critical response
On Rotten Tomatoes, the film has an approval rating of 58% based on 183 reviews, with an average rating of 5.80/10. The website's critical consensus is: "Despite fine work by an appealing cast, It's Complicated is predictable romantic comedy fare, going for broad laughs instead of subtlety and nuance." Another review aggregator, Metacritic, which assigns a weighted average, gave the film a score of 57 out of 100, based on 30 critics, indicating "mixed or average reviews". Audiences surveyed by CinemaScore gave the film a grade A−.

Wesley Morris of the Boston Globe called the film "the most emotionally sophisticated of all Meyers’s fantasies" and praised the acting performances in it. He noted that the film felt like "a made-for-Meryl film [in which] Streep deploys all her best moves [...] in movie star mode, and she’s irresistible," and declared Baldwin a worthy match to her, writing: "It’s Complicated unleashes an unabashedly, desperately romantic side of Baldwin that we haven’t seen before. He doesn’t steal this movie so much as grant all Streep’s fluttering and twirling and hand-fanning an exuberant counterweight." In his review for the Washington Post, Michael O'Sullivan called the film a "very grown-up – and very funny – love story [which] manages to be both light on its feet and heavy enough to deliver something of a message." He concluded: "Food Network porn, hot, middle-age sex and a happy, if slightly bittersweet, ending. For a particular audience – but not just for that audience – what's not to love?" Peter Travers of Rolling Stone called the film an "unapologetic chick flick" and wrote that "you don't have to feel guilty for lapping up this froth. Just don't expect nourishment." He rated the film two and a half stars out of four.

Roger Ebert of the Chicago Sun-Times also gave it two and a half stars and called the film a prime example of Meyers' established "cottage industry of movies about romantically inclined middle-aged people." He found praise for the cast of both Baldwin and Streep, the latter of whom he felt "inspires as so often our belief that she's good at everything she does," but noted that while the film contained "funny stuff" and likeable characters, It's Complicated was more of "a rearrangement of the goods in Nancy Meyers' bakery, and some of them belong on the day-old shelf." Writing for Time magazine, Mary Pols complimented Streep's "radiant, funny and endearingly vulnerable" performance and Meyers' "clever and fresh [...] intent in showing the reality of the fantasy coming true." However, she felt that It's Complicated "is positioned more as a which-guy-will-she-choose story" which misses "dramatic tension to feed that plot line."

Lisa Schwarzbaum of Entertainment Weekly gave the film a B− rating and declared the film a "middle-aged porn, the specialty of Meyers, who also set ladies and interior decorators drooling over homes and gardens in 2006's The Holiday." Lou Lumenick from New York Post stated that it "coulda had more laughs, but in the spirit of seasonal good cheer, let me predict that the best-chocolate-croissant-making montage in Hollywood history is going to help this one clean up at the box office." He found that Martin seemed "uncomfortable in his thankless role," while "Streep and Baldwin, though, seem to be thoroughly enjoying themselves" and compared the film to Noël Coward's classic farce Private Lives. Salon.com writer Stephanie Zacharek dismissed the film as "another missive from romantic-comedy hell," and felt that "Alec Baldwin -- in his undershorts, no less -- saves Nancy Meyers' latest midlife whingefest."

Box office
Released on December 25, 2009 in the United States, the film opened in 2,887 locations and placed fourth on the US box office after its first weekend. It charted behind Avatar, Sherlock Holmes, and Alvin and the Chipmunks: The Squeakquel with $22.1 million, scoring a $7,655 average income per theatre. It played well through the holidays and into January 2010, ultimately closing on April 1 with $112.7 million in North America and a total of $219.1 million worldwide.

Accolades

Home media
It's Complicated  became available on DVD and Blu-ray Tuesday, April 27, 2010.

References

External links
 
 
 

2009 films
Films directed by Nancy Meyers
2009 romantic comedy-drama films
Universal Pictures films
Relativity Media films
American sex comedy films
2000s English-language films
American romantic comedy-drama films
Comedy of remarriage films
Films set in Santa Barbara, California
Films set in California
Films set in New York City
Films scored by Hans Zimmer
Films produced by Scott Rudin
Films with screenplays by Nancy Meyers
2000s sex comedy films
2009 comedy films
2000s American films